Lakshmikant Mandal is an Indian politician in Janata Dal (United). He was elected as a member of the Bihar Legislative Assembly from Nathnagar on 24 October 2019.

References

Living people
Members of the Bihar Legislative Assembly
Janata Dal (United) politicians
Year of birth missing (living people)